Kelme may refer to:

Kelmė, a town in Lithuania
Kelme (company), a Spanish firm that manufactures sport shoes and clothing
Kelme (cycling team), a professional cycling team sponsored by the Spanish firm, active from 1980 to 2006

See also

 Barsakelmes (disambiguation), including Barsa-Kelmes
 KELM (disambiguation)